S.C.O.T. (an acronym for Sickest Cunt Out There) is the third studio album by Australian rapper Kerser. It was released on 25 October 2013 under Obese Records.

Kerser embarked on an Australian tour from February–March 2014 for the release of S.C.O.T.

Track listing

Charts

References

2013 albums
Obese Records albums